Jacques Jules Boufil (or Bouffil, Bouffils, Bonfil) (Muret, May 14, 1783 – Toulouse, November 1, 1868) was a French composer and clarinetist.

He was a pupil of Xavier Lefèvre at the Paris Conservatoire, gaining a First Prize in 1806, which until 1817 carried with it the award of a pair of French-made clarinets in B flat and C.

His compositions for clarinet duet and trio are some of the most worthwhile written for the medium. They are full-scale works of considerable substance and were doubtless intended for performance by professionals.

Discography

 Shall-u-mo classical recordings CDC-1003
 Trio Op.7 No.2 performed by Larry Combs, Paul Drushler, Allen Sigel

References

1783 births
1868 deaths
French classical clarinetists
French composers
French male composers
19th-century French male musicians